Montabaur is an electoral constituency (German: Wahlkreis) represented in the Bundestag. It elects one member via first-past-the-post voting. Under the current constituency numbering system, it is designated as constituency 204. It is located in northern Rhineland-Palatinate, comprising the district of Westerwaldkreis and the eastern part of the Rhein-Lahn-Kreis district.

Montabaur was created for the inaugural 1949 federal election. Since 2021, it has been represented by Tanja Machalet of the Social Democratic Party (SPD).

Geography
Montabaur is located in northern Rhineland-Palatinate. As of the 2021 federal election, it comprises the district of Westerwaldkreis and, from the district of Rhein-Lahn-Kreis, the Verbandsgemeinden of Aar-Einrich, Diez, and Nastätten, and the municipalities of Attenhausen, Dessighofen, Dienethal, Dornholzhausen, Geisig, Hömberg, Lollschied, Misselberg, Nassau, Obernhof, Oberwies, Pohl, Schweighausen, Seelbach, Singhofen, Sulzbach, Weinähr, Winden, and Zimmerschied from the Bad Ems-Nassau Verbandsgemeinde.

History
Montabaur was created in 1949, then known as Westerburg. It acquired its current name in the 1965 election. In the 1949 election, it was Rhineland-Palatinate constituency 8 in the numbering system. In the 1953 through 1976 elections, it was number 155. In the 1980 through 1998 elections, it was number 153. In the 2002 election, it was number 207. In the 2005 election, it was number 206. In the 2009 and 2013 elections, it was number 205. Since the 2017 election, it has been number 204.

Originally, the constituency comprised the districts of Oberwesterwaldkreis, Unterwesterwaldkreis, Unterlahnkreis, and St. Goarshausen. While its borders did not change until the 2002 election, a number of administrative changes took place in the following decades: in 1961, the St. Goarshausen district was renamed Loreleykreis; in 1969, the Unterlahnkreis and Loreleykreis districts were merged into the new Rhein-Lahn-Kreis district; and in 1974, the Oberwesterwaldkreis and Unterwesterwaldkreis districts were merged into the new Westerwaldkreis district. The constituency acquired its current borders in the 2002 election.

Members
The constituency has been held by the Christian Democratic Union (CDU) during all but two Bundestag terms since its creation. It was first represented by Robert Stauch of the CDU from 1949 to 1965, followed by August Hanz until 1972. Willi Peiter of the Social Democratic Party (SPD) was elected in 1972 and served a single term. Former member Hanz regained it in 1976 and served until 1987. Joachim Hörster was then representative from 1987 to 1998. Rudolf Scharping of the SPD was elected in 1998 and served a single term. Former member Hörster regained it in 2002 and served until 2013. Andreas Nick was elected 2013 and re-elected in 2017. Tanja Machalet won the constituency for the SPD in 2021.

Election results

2021 election

2017 election

2013 election

2009 election

References

Federal electoral districts in Rhineland-Palatinate
1949 establishments in West Germany
Constituencies established in 1949
Westerwaldkreis
Rhein-Lahn-Kreis